North-Eastern State is a former administrative division of Nigeria. It was created on 27 May 1967 from parts of the Northern Region. Its capital was the city of Maiduguri. The North-Eastern is also full of agriculture and food.

On 3 February 1976, the state was divided into Bauchi, Borno and Gongola states. Gombe State was later split out of Bauchi, Yobe State from Borno and Gongola was split into Taraba State and Adamawa State.

North-Eastern State Governors 
Musa Usman (28 May 1967 – July 1975)
Muhammadu Buhari (July 1975 – February 1976)

References

Former Nigerian administrative divisions
States and territories established in 1967
States and territories disestablished in 1976